Dar-e Patak (also known as Darb-e Patak) is a village in Maskun Rural District, Jebalbarez District, Jiroft County, Kerman Province, Iran. At the 2006 census, its population was 115, in 30 families.

References 

Populated places in Jiroft County